The McFlurry is a brand of flavored ice cream distributed and sold by the American-based international fast food chain McDonald's.

History 
The McFlurry was created by Canadian McDonald's franchisee Ron McLellan in Bathurst, New Brunswick, in 1995. In the U.S., the McFlurry was test-marketed in select regions in 1997. By March of 1998 the product was available to all U.S. and Canada locations and has been gradually introduced in other locations since then.

Preparation 

The McFlurry consists of whipped, soft serve McDonald's vanilla-flavored ice cream in a cup. The McFlurry has a specially designed spoon with a hole in the handle which is attached to a blender. Various types of candy or cookies are added to the cup, which are then blended using the spoon. McFlurry flavors vary from market to market, and new flavors are introduced regularly.

The ice cream in a McFlurry is the same that McDonald's uses for its cones and sundaes. The ice cream is made from Ultra-high-temperature processing (UHT) milk, extended with methylcellulose. CNBC reported that, from late 2016, McDonald's started phasing out artificial flavors from its vanilla ice cream. The change was part of an effort to recover the more than 500 million customer visits it had lost since 2012.

Reviews 
Despite calling the McFlurry "a quick-serve medley of gelatinous, innocuous ice cream that some reviewers might consider closer to caulk than dairy," Wil Fulton of the Thrillist ranked the M&M McFlurry at the end of his list of the 17 Best Fast Food Desserts. The Daily Meal put the Oreo McFlurry on its list of the Best Fast Food Desserts.

Controversies 
Prior to September 2006, the opening of McFlurry container lids was of a size that caused some animals to become trapped with their heads inside the container. A small outcry in the UK, particularly to protect hedgehogs, caused a redesign in the container shape. After "significant research and design testing," the size of the opening was reduced to prevent entry of these animals. In 2019, McDonald's announced it would remove the lids as part of a move to reduce the use of single-use plastics by the chain.

The program 30 Rock prominently featured the McFlurry in the plot of its season 3 episode 11 show, "St. Valentine's Day". The intentionally heavy-handed product placement caused a controversy in the media.

See also 
 List of McDonald's products
 Dessert

Works cited

References

External links 
 Nutritional information for a sample McFlurry

McDonald's foods
Ice cream brands
Canadian inventions
Products introduced in 1997